Carried Away (also known as Acts of Love) is a 1996 American English language film directed by Brazilian Bruno Barreto. It is based on the novel Farmer by Jim Harrison.

The film stars Dennis Hopper, Amy Irving (Barreto's then wife), Gary Busey, and Amy Locane.  The tagline reads "No love is safe from desire".

Plot
Joseph Svenden is a middle-aged schoolteacher who lives on a farm with his dying mother. In his simple life there is no excitement, even in his long-time relationship with a widow. However, when a 17-year-old beauty enrolls in his class, life takes an unexpected turn. She boards her horse in his barn and she then seduces him. They carry on a furtive relationship which leaves him torn between the passion, and knowing that he is doing something wrong. When her indiscretion starts the inevitable scandal, many different reactions ensue.

Cast
 Dennis Hopper as Joseph Svenden
Todd Duffey as Young Joseph Svenden
 Amy Irving as Rosealee Henson
 Amy Locane as Catherine Wheeler
 Julie Harris as Joseph's Mother
 Gary Busey as Major Nathan Wheeler
 Hal Holbrook as Dr. Evans
 Christopher Pettiet as Robert Henson
 Priscilla Pointer as Lily Henson
 Gail Cronauer as Beverly
 Alissa Alban as School Board Superintendent
 E.J. Morris as School Board Woman
 Joe Stevens as School Board Man
 Connie Cooper as Charlotte
 Eleese Lester as Marie
 Doug Jackson as Frank

Production
Bruno Barreto directed his wife Amy Irving in a sex scene with Dennis Hopper, which was later edited. "You wouldn't believe what was cut," Irving said. "Sometimes I couldn't believe what he was asking me to do."

References

External links
 
 

1996 films
1996 romantic drama films
Films directed by Bruno Barreto
American romantic drama films
Films about educators
CineTel Films films
New Line Cinema films
Films scored by Bruce Broughton
1990s English-language films
1990s American films